Sugar Creek is a light rail station on the LYNX Blue Line in the NoDa neighborhood of Charlotte, North Carolina, United States. It opened on March 16, 2018, as part of the Blue Line extension to the UNC Charlotte campus and features a single island platform.

References

External links

Sugar Creek Station

Lynx Blue Line stations
Railway stations in the United States opened in 2018
2018 establishments in North Carolina